Ceratotherium (Greek: "horn" (keratos), "beast" (therion)) is a genus of the family Rhinocerotidae, consisting of a single extant species, the white rhinoceros (Ceratotherium simum), and its extinct relatives, Ceratotherium neumayri and Ceratotherium mauritanicum, of which Ceratotherium efficax is considered a synonym. Another species known as Ceratotherium praecox is now considered a member of the related genus Diceros.

References

Mammal genera with one living species
Taxa named by John Edward Gray
Rhinoceroses
Mammal genera
Extant Tortonian first appearances